Devoke Water is a small lake in the mid-west region of the English Lake District, in the county of Cumbria. It is the largest tarn in the Lake District.

It lies on Birker Fell, 1 km to the west of the road between Ulpha and Eskdale, at an altitude of 770 feet (223 m).

It can be reached via a bridle track. There is a two-storey stone boathouse-cum-refuge and a ruined stable. Devoke Water has an outlet in the north west, via Linbeck Gill, which joins the River Esk at the hamlet of Linbeck.

The fishing rights to Devoke Water are owned by Millom Anglers and it is stocked with brown trout. It also holds perch.

The Circuit of Devoke Water
One of the chapters of Alfred Wainwright's The Outlying Fells of Lakeland is a circular walk anticlockwise around Devoke Water, starting and finishing on the road to the east. He warns that "Linbeck Gill is uncrossable dryshod after rain".

All six summits are classified as Birketts. Yoadcastle is classed as a Fellranger, being described by Richards in the Coniston volume of his book series. It is among the 21 such summits (originally 18 before the extension of the Lake District) which are not included in Wainwright's main list of 214.

References

Lakes of the Lake District
Fells of the Lake District
Borough of Copeland